Fort Montgomery may refer to:

 Fort Montgomery (Hudson River), American Revolutionary War fort near West Point, New York
 Fort Montgomery, New York, hamlet named after the Hudson River fort
 Fort Montgomery (Alabama), War of 1812 fort in Baldwin County, Alabama
 Fort Montgomery (Lake Champlain), 1844 fort in Clinton County, New York
 Fort Montgomery (Eureka), 1861 fort in Greenwood County, Kansas
 Fort Montgomery (Linn County), 1855 fortified home in Kansas